Miroljub Labus (Serbian Cyrillic: Мирољуб Лабус; born 28 February 1947) is a Serbian economist and former politician. He is currently a University of Belgrade professor, lecturing political economy at the University of Belgrade Faculty of Law. He is also the owner of consulting firm Belox Advisory Service.

Labus was the Deputy Prime Minister of Serbia from March 2004, serving under PM Vojislav Koštunica. He resigned on May 3, 2006, after EU suspended enlargement talks with Serbia over Ratko Mladić. Labus also resigned from the position of President of G17 Plus.

Early life and education
Labus was born in Mala Krsna, near Smederevo, PR Serbia, FPR Yugoslavia. He graduated from law school in 1970 from the University of Belgrade Faculty of Law. This was followed by two postgraduate qualifications in economics.

Academic and administrative career
Labus began his career in academia as a university professor. In 1983, he was a Fulbright fellow at Cornell University.

Labus was a senior adviser at the Federal Statistics Bureau (Savezni zavod za statistiku) in Belgrade between 1986 and 1994. Since 1993, he has been a researcher at Belgrade's Economics Institute. He edited the Federal Bureau of Statistics's Economic Trend publication from 1990 to 1996, and the Belgrade Economics Institute's Economic Barometer from 1994 to 2000. Labus has also been involved with the National Bank of Yugoslavia and World Bank.

Political career
Already politically involved as a macroeconomic policy adviser to SFR Yugoslavia's federal government, he joined the recently established Democratic Party (DS) in 1990.

Democratic Party
In 1992, Labus was elected as MP to the FR Yugoslavia's federal parliament. While in this role, he was also a member of the parliamentary Monetary Policy Committee. In 1994, he was promoted to Vice-President of the Democratic Party under Zoran Đinđić. He held this position until 1997.

G17 Plus
In 1999, Labus became President of the Administrative Board of the G17 Plus movement. At this time, the G17 Plus movement was a lobby group focused on encouraging economic reforms within Serbia. G17 Plus soon become powerful, with significant public support. In 2000, he left the board of G17 Plus, taking up a position as Deputy Prime Minister of Yugoslavia and Minister for International Economic Relations (in the federal government following the overthrow of Slobodan Milošević).

Leading up to the 2002 Serbian presidential elections, it was apparent that the current Serbian Prime Minister, Zoran Đinđić, did not have the appeal to match Koštunica, another candidate. Đinđić agreed to back Koštunica's former ally, Labus, as an alternative candidate. In the resulting election, Koštunica defeated Labus. However, the election did not gain the required 50% voter turnout and the results were declared void. Labus continued on in his position for another year.

Labus continued working with G17 Plus and, in late 2002, he began transforming the lobby group into a full-fledged centrist political party, becoming its President. After the elections of December 2003, Labus and his party formed a minority coalition with the Democratic Party of Serbia and several other minor parties, in order to keep ultra-nationalist Tomislav Nikolić out of power. As a result, he retained his current positions. In 2006, Labus resigned from the position of President of G17 Plus party.

Books
 Fundamentals of Economics,  (1995, 1997) (Original: Osnovi ekonomije)
 Fundamentals of Political Economy, (with D. Šoškić) (1992) (Original: Osnovi političke ekonomije)
 Contemporary Political Economy (1990) (Original: Savremena politička ekonomija)
 General Equilibrium of Economy, (with D. Vujović) (1990) (Original: Opšta privredna ravnoteža)
 Social or Collective Ownership Rights (1987) (Original: Društvena ili kolektivna vlasnička prava)

References

External links
 
Лабус ради за Мишковића, Politika, 7 March 2008

1947 births
Living people
Deputy Prime Ministers of Serbia
Writers from Smederevo
Democratic Party (Serbia) politicians
G17 Plus politicians
Candidates for President of Serbia
Serbian economists
Academic staff of the University of Belgrade
University of Belgrade Faculty of Law alumni
Politicians from Smederevo
Fulbright alumni